Bombylius is a large genus of flies belonging to the family Bombyliidae. They are known as the bee-flies, due to their striking resemblance to bees and bumblebees, and are distributed worldwide. One species of the genus, Bombylius major, is widely distributed throughout the northern hemisphere and is very well known.

Physiology

All species in the genus share a similarity with the unrelated bees and bumblebees, which they mimic, possessing a thick coat of fur, with a colour ranging from yellow to orange. They can, however, be told apart from their models by the long and stiff proboscis they possess, used to probe for nectar as they fly (much like a hummingbird), by their rapid and darting flight,  and by the peculiar structure of their legs.
As larvae, they are parasitic and infest the nests of solitary bees (and possibly wasps), consuming their food stores and grubs.

Species

European species
Subgenus Bombylius
Bombylius aaroni Báez, 1983 – Canary Islands
Bombylius ambustus Pallas, 1818 – southern Palaearctic, Near East
Bombylius analis Olivier, 1789 – southern Palaearctic, Near East
Bombylius candidus Loew, 1855 – Palaearctic, Near East
Bombylius canescens Mikan, 1796 – Palaearctic, Near East
Bombylius cinerascens Mikan, 1796 – Europe, Near East 
Bombylius citrinus Loew, 1855 – southern Europe, Near East
Bombylius discolor Mikan, 1796 – Europe, Near East
Bombylius fimbriatus Meigen, 1820 – Palaearctic, Near East, North Africa
Bombylius flavipes Wiedemann, 1828 – Italy, Spain, Near East, North Africa
Bombylius floccosus Loew, 1857 – southeastern Europe, Near East
Bombylius fulvescens Wiedemann in Meigen, 1820 – Palaearctic, Near East, North Africa 
Bombylius fumosus Dufour, 1832 – Spain
Bombylius fuscus Fabricius, 1791 – southern Palaearctic, Near East, North Africa
Bombylius kutshurganicus Paramonov, 1926 – southern Russia, Ukraine, Moldova
Bombylius major Linnaeus, 1758
Bombylius medius Linnaeus, 1758 – Palaearctic, Near East, North Africa
Bombylius minor Linnaeus, 1758 – Palaearctic, Near East
Bombylius modestus Loew, 1873 – southern Palaearctic, Near East, North Africa
Bombylius mus Bigot, 1862 – southern Palaearctic, Near East, North Africa
Bombylius niveus Meigen, 1804 – southern Europe, Near East
Bombylius nubilus Mikan, 1796 – central and southern Europe, Near East, North Africa
Bombylius oceanus Becker, 1908 – Canary Islands
Bombylius pallens Wiedemann in Meigen, 1820 – Italy, Spain, Portugal
Bombylius pardalotus François, 1969 – Italy, Spain
Bombylius pintuarius Báez, 1983 – Canary Islands
Bombylius posticus Fabricius, 1805 – Palaearctic, Near East, North Africa
Bombylius pumilus Meigen, 1820 – southern Europe, Near East
Bombylius semifuscus Meigen, 1820 – Palaearctic, Near East, North Africa
Bombylius shelkovnikovi Paramonov, 1926 – Italy, Greece, eastern Palaearctic, Near East
Bombylius torquatus Loew, 1855 – southern Europe, Near East, North Africa
Bombylius trichurus Pallas, 1818 – Palaearctic, Near East
Bombylius venosus Mikan, 1796 – Europe, Near East
Subgenus Zephyrectes
Bombylius cinerarius Pallas & Wiedemann, 1818 – southern Palaearctic, Near East, North Africa
Bombylius cruciatus Fabricius, 1798 – southern Europe, Near East, North Africa
Bombylius leucopygus Macquart, 1846 – Spain, North Africa
Bombylius quadrifarius Loew. 1855 – southeastern Europe, eastern Palaearctic, Near East

North American species

Bombylius aestivus
Bombylius albicapillus
Bombylius altimyia
Bombylius anthophilus
Bombylius anthophoroides
Bombylius arizonicus
Bombylius atriceps
Bombylius aureus
Bombylius aurifer
Bombylius auriferiodes
Bombylius austini
Bombylius balion
Bombylius ballmeri
Bombylius breviabdominalis
Bombylius cachinnans
Bombylius cinerivus
Bombylius comanche
Bombylius curtirhynchus
Bombylius diegoensis
Bombylius duncani
Bombylius eboreus
Bombylius facialis
Bombylius fascipennis
Bombylius flavifacies
Bombylius flavipilosa
Bombylius fraudulentus
Bombylius frommerorum
Bombylius fulvibasoides
Bombylius helvus
Bombylius heximaculatus
Bombylius incanus
Bombylius japygus
Bombylius kanabensis
Bombylius lancifer
Bombylius lassenensis
Bombylius macfarlandi
Bombylius medorae
Bombylius metopium
Bombylius mexicanus
Bombylius mohavensis
Bombylius montanus
Bombylius nevadensis
Bombylius nicholsonae
Bombylius nigriventris
Bombylius painteri
Bombylius pendens
Bombylius phlogmodes
Bombylius plichtai
Bombylius pygmaeus 
Bombylius quirinus
Bombylius ravus
Bombylius silvus
Bombylius sylphae
Bombylius texanus
Bombylius validus
Bombylius varius
Bombylius washingtoniensis
Bombylius xanthothrix
Bombylius zapataensis
Bombylius zircon

Species worldwide
 List of Bombylius species

References

External links

Fauna Europaea
Nomina Insecta Nearctica

Bombyliidae genera
Bombyliidae
Taxa named by Carl Linnaeus